Magnus Bak Klaris (born 23 January 1996) is a Danish road cyclist, who rides for UCI Continental team .

Major results

2013
 2nd Time trial, National Junior Road Championships
2014
 1st Overall Peace Race Juniors
1st Points classification
 1st Paris–Roubaix Juniors
 1st Stage 5 Grand Prix Rüebliland
 5th Road race, UCI Junior Road World Championships
2015
 7th GP Horsens
2016
 5th Rytgerløbet
2017
 9th Overall Ronde van Midden-Nederland
2018
 1st Stage 4 (TTT) Tour de l'Avenir
 3rd GP Horsens
2021
 2nd GP Herning
2022
 1st Lillehammer GP
 7th Arno Wallaard Memorial
 7th Ringerike GP

References

External links
 
 

1996 births
Living people
Danish male cyclists
Cyclists from Copenhagen